Anne Marivin (born 23 January 1974) is a French actress. She has appeared in more than fifty film and television productions since 1994.

Marivin was noticed in television appearances such as Tel père, tel flic (2001) and Père et Maire (2002), and progressed from roles in television to cinema. She has appeared in films such as Ah ! si j'étais riche (2002), Mon Idole (2002), Chouchou (2003), Podium (2004), Narco (2004), A Ticket to Space (2006), and Bienvenue chez les Ch'tis (2008).

Personal life
She was born in Senlis, Oise.

She is the partner of the designer Joachim Roncin.

Filmography

References

External links

 
 
 Anne Marivin Biography at Premiere.fr

1974 births
Living people
People from Senlis
French film actresses
French television actresses
20th-century French actresses
21st-century French actresses
Cours Florent alumni